Q112 may refer to:
Quran 112, "The Declaration of God's Unity" (al-ikhlas)
Q112, New York bus route